Durford Wood is a hamlet in the civil parish of Liss in Hampshire, England. The hamlet is situated in the Woolmer Forest and lies on the Hampshire-West Sussex border. Its nearest town is Petersfield, which lies approximately 5.2 miles (7.5 km) south-west from the hamlet.

Villages in Hampshire